Sleeping Dogs Lie is a 2005 American drama film by writer Chumahan Bowen and director Stuart Lessner, starring Rage Against the Machine drummer Brad Wilk and Ed Asner. The film also features Tool lead singer Maynard James Keenan as Deputy Lance.

Plot 
After several weeks of haunting phone calls and strange happenings, Cincinnati, Ohio resident Jeff Hannon (Wilk) drives to Beuford, Texas to inform the local authorities-Sheriff Delaney (Asner) and Deputy Lance (Keenan)-that he has information on the 25-year-old unsolved murder of Priscilla Booth-a girl whose body was never found. At first, Delaney thinks Jeff is crazy, and doesn't take him seriously, but strange phone calls made to Hannon's cell phone, from "Priscilla," as well as it being apparent that Hannon is shaken up, convince Delaney to hear Jeff out. Delaney takes Hannon to lunch at Maggie's restaurant, where Jeff finishes his story, and the Sheriff agrees to put his mind at ease by taking him to where the phone calls told him the body would be, "The Tree in the Flats." They arrive at the scene, where Jeff starts digging, where he finds the remains. Sheriff Delaney then shoots Jeff and kills him, implying that Delaney is the one who killed Priscilla, and hid her body.

Cast 
 Brad Wilk as Jeff Hannon
 Ed Asner as Sheriff Delaney
 Maynard James Keenan as Deputy Lance
 Chelsea Field as Maggie
 Peter Looney as Old Timer
 Ione Inoke as Tow Truck Driver
 Annie Burgstede as Voice of Priscilla Booth
 Steven Brooks as Voice of Baret
 Kim Harris as Voice of Charlotte

Production 
Ed Asner and Maynard James Keenan joined the production after they read the script.  Keenan was cast against type; originally, his role was minor, but it was expanded during filming.  Shooting took place in Lancaster, California, in 2004.

Release 
Sleeping Dogs Lie premiered at the New York International Independent Film and Video Festival.

It was released on DVD on February 28, 2005.

Reception 
Dread Central gave the film 4.5 out of 5 stars, saying, "It isn't often that you find a short film with both a great script and such high production values. But Sleeping Dogs Lie is exactly that type of film."

Awards

References

External links 
 
 

2005 films
2005 short films
2005 drama films
American independent films
American drama short films
2005 independent films
2000s English-language films
2000s American films